Suruj Ragoonath (born 22 March 1968) is a former West Indies international cricketer.

An aggressive right-handed opening batsman, Ragoonath played domestically for Trinidad and Tobago between 1989 and 2001. He played in two Test matches in March 1999, both against Australia, but without success.

Ragoonath is currently chief executive officer of the Trinidad and Tobago Cricket Board. He has also been a policeman.

1968 births
Living people
Trinidad and Tobago cricketers
West Indies Test cricketers